Hossein Mortezaeian Abkenar (born 1967) is an Iranian writer and screenwriter.

Life
Hossein Mortezaeian Abkenar was born in Tehran. Abkenar received Bachelor of Arts in performing arts from University of Tehran. During Iran-Iraq war, he did his military service near border where affected his novel's atmosphere.
He was one of writers of the screenplay for the film No One Knows about Persian Cats, directed by Bahman Ghobadi and awarded the Special Jury Prize in the Un Certain Regard section at the 2009 Cannes Film Festival.
Abkenar's books are banned from sale and publication in Iran.

Awards
His first novel, Scorpion on the Steps of Andimeshk Train Station, or Blood’s Dripping From This Train, received the 2007 Hooshang Golshiri Literary Award for 'Best First Novel', and the Mehregan Award for the best novel of the year, as well as the Vaav Award for the year's most unique novel.
In September 2014, he was granted a fellowship by Black Mountain Institute at the University of Nevada, Las Vegas where each fellow in the nine-month writing program .

Works

Books
 The Concert of Forbidden Tars 
 The French Perfume
 Scorpion on the Steps of Andimeshk Train Station, or Blood's Dripping From This Train

Screenplay
 No One Knows About Persian Cats
 Mandoo

References

External links
 Official Website
 Rahman’s Story
 Classmates: A Novel

Living people
Writers from Tehran
Iranian male short story writers
Iranian male novelists
Iranian novelists
University of Tehran alumni
Iranian expatriates in the United States
Iranian screenwriters
Persian-language writers
1967 births